Asher Robbins (1761–1845) was a U.S. Senator from Rhode Island from 1825 to 1839. Senator Robbins may also refer to:

Alan Robbins (born 1943), California State Senate
Edward Everett Robbins (1860–1919), Pennsylvania State Senate
Robert D. Robbins (born 1944), Pennsylvania State Senate
Samuel K. Robbins (1853–1926), New Jersey State Senate

See also
C. A. Robins (1884–1970), Idaho State Senate